José Lovito (born 13 January 1970) is an Argentine former cyclist. He competed in the men's sprint at the 1992 Summer Olympics.

References

External links
 

1970 births
Living people
Argentine male cyclists
Olympic cyclists of Argentina
Cyclists at the 1992 Summer Olympics
Place of birth missing (living people)